Wilbert Arnold "Bill" Tatum (January 23, 1933 – February 26, 2009) was an American newspaper executive, who variously served as the editor, publisher, chairman and chief executive officer of the New York Amsterdam News, a weekly newspaper serving the African-American community of New York City. He was later a large investor in the Hooters franchise.

Early years
Tatum was born in a three-room shack in Durham, North Carolina, the 10th of 13 children, in 1933. He attended Durham's segregated schools, working during the summer in tobacco fields.

Education/US Marine Corps
He majored in sociology at Lincoln University, the United States' first degree-granting historically black university. During the Korean War, he served in the United States Marine Corps as a drill instructor in Japan from 1951 until 1954. After completing his military service, he attended Yale University as a National Urban Fellow. Tatum was later awarded a master's degree from Occidental College, where he majored in urban studies.

Tatum spent 13 years working as a mayoral appointee in the government of New York City, during the John Lindsay and Abraham Beame administrations. While director of community relations at the New York City Department of Buildings, he spent a cold winter's night in 1967 in a Queens housing project that lacked heat, to publicize the circumstances of tenants there. He proposed a $6 billion "clothing stamp" program that would provide clothing for the poor nationwide while assisting the city's struggling garment industry. Another proposal would have replaced the site of the former Madison Square Garden with an indoor amusement park.

Amsterdam News
Tatum was part of a group that purchased the paper in the 1970s, the third ownership group in the history of the publication, which included notable investors such as former New York State Comptroller H. Carl McCall and Manhattan Borough President Percy E. Sutton. By the mid-1980s, Tatum had invested more than $400 thousand in the publication, most of it borrowed from banks against the value of his real estate holdings. he acquired control of the paper in 1983 and became the paper's sole owner in 1996 after acquiring the stake of the last independent shareholder.

During his 25 years with the Amsterdam News, Tatum's name was "nearly synonymous with the paper's", as described in a notice by The New York Times announcing his death. Although circulation dropped from 58,907 in 1977 to 25,962 in 2000, the paper remained influential.

During the 1984 presidential election, Tatum declined to endorse the candidacy of Jesse Jackson or any of the other Democratic Party candidates. During Tatum's tenure, the paper published a defense of Tawana Brawley after official findings found her 1987 sexual assault claims to be false. In 1989, he decided to disclose the identity of the sexual assault victim in the widely publicized Central Park 5 case.

While Ed Koch was Mayor of New York City, Tatum wrote a weekly editorial series, "Why Koch Should Resign", that ran on the front page from February 1986 to September 1989, accusing Koch of leading an ineffective and corrupt municipal government that did not address the concerns of minority residents of the city. After Koch lost the mayoral primary in 1989 to David Dinkins, Tatum's last editorial read: "On September 12 at 11:50 p.m., Edward I. Koch conceded defeat in the primary. December 31 will be his last day of work. End of series."

Tatum was credited by members of the city's Jewish community with improving the paper's balance in coverage of Jewish subjects. The associate executive director of the American Jewish Congress recognized in 1984 that "Tatum has been very sympathetic and understanding of problems confronting both Jews and blacks". Mayor Koch had earlier called the paper "an anti-Semitic rag" that had become "less rabid in its coverage than it was before", but held a July 1984 debate with Tatum on Jewish-black relations after Tatum published an editorial critical of the Mayor.

While most of the initial investors had left over time, John L. Edmonds had stayed on over the years, feuding with Tatum over the management of the paper and Tatum's use of funds. A suit filed by Edmonds ended in 1996 with a jury finding that Tatum owed Edmonds just over $1 million that it determined had been diverted from the paper's parent company, with Edmonds' attorney describing that Tatum had "used The Amsterdam News since 1982 as his own personal piggy bank".

Tatum stepped down in 1997 and named his daughter Elinor Tatum, then 26 years old and a graduate of New York University's postgraduate journalism program, to serve as publisher and editor-in-chief of the paper. "I was in shock," she was quoted as saying after the unexpected promotion. Tatum retained his position as chairman of the board after his daughter took over day-to-day operation of the paper, and he retained the position until his death.

Tatum wrote that Al Gore had chosen Joseph Lieberman as his running mate in the 2000 United States presidential election because Lieberman would be able to raise funds from fellow Jews, stating that "Gore and his minions did it for the money".

Asked by his daughter why he did not pursue public office, he responded that he could help most in his role leading the oldest continuously-published African-American newspaper.

Family
Tatum married Susan Kohn, a Jewish refugee from Czechoslovakia. Their daughter, Elinor, was given the choice of following his religion and becoming a Baptist or of following her mother's faith and preparing for her bat mitzvah.

Later years
As of 1984, he lived in the Manhattan's East Village in a 23-room triplex that he had bought in 1967 for $4,000 and had improved. Through the mid-1980s, he had made money in real estate, purchasing and renovating abandoned or neglected buildings that were reconstructed and repaired using unskilled ex-offenders and political refugee laborers.

In 1984, Tatum established an informal group of Jewish and African-American leaders that met to address issues regarding relations between the two communities. That same year, he was recognized by the Federation of Jewish Philanthropies for his efforts on behalf of runaway children in the Lower East Side of Manhattan.

Death
Tatum died, aged 76, on February 26, 2009, from multiple organ failure in Dubrovnik, Croatia, where he was traveling with his wife, Susan. A diabetic, Tatum was a wheelchair user at the time of his death. He was survived by his wife, daughter, a brother and three sisters.

References

External links

1933 births
2009 deaths

20th-century African-American people
20th-century American businesspeople
21st-century African-American people
African-American publishers (people)
American publishers (people)
Businesspeople from Durham, North Carolina
Deaths from diabetes
Deaths from multiple organ failure
Lincoln University (Pennsylvania) alumni
New York Amsterdam News people
Occidental College alumni
People from the East Village, Manhattan
United States Marines